Marquez Stevenson (born March 26, 1998) is an American football wide receiver for the Cleveland Browns of the National Football League (NFL). He played college football at Houston.

Early years
Stevenson attended Northwood High School in Shreveport, Louisiana. He committed to the University of Houston to play college football.

College career
As a true freshman at Houston in 2016, Stevenson played in two games and did not record a reception but did have 36 receiving yards off a hook-and-ladder play. He missed the 2017 season, due to a torn ACL. He returned from the injury in 2018 to lead the team with 75 receptions for 1,019 yards and nine touchdowns. Stevenson again led the team with 52 receptions for 907 yards and nine touchdowns his junior year in 2019. He returned to Houston for his senior season in 2020, rather than enter the 2020 NFL Draft. At the conclusion of his senior season, he participated in the 2021 Senior Bowl.

College statistics

Professional career

Buffalo Bills
Stevenson was drafted by the Buffalo Bills in the sixth round (203rd overall) of the 2021 NFL Draft. On May 13, 2021, Stevenson signed his four-year rookie contract with Buffalo. He was placed on injured reserve on September 1, 2021. He was activated on November 25.

On August 31, 2022, Stevenson was placed on injured reserve. He was released on December 6, 2022 but was re-signed to the practice squad three days later. On December 13, Stevenson was released from the practice squad.

Cleveland Browns
On December 14, 2022, the Cleveland Browns signed Stevenson to their practice squad. He signed a reserve/future contract on January 9, 2023.

References

External links
Houston Cougars bio

1998 births
Living people
Players of American football from Shreveport, Louisiana
American football wide receivers
Houston Cougars football players
Buffalo Bills players
Cleveland Browns players